The BYU Cougars baseball team is a varsity intercollegiate athletic team of Brigham Young University in Provo, Utah, United States. The team is a member of the West Coast Conference, which is part of the National Collegiate Athletic Association's Division I. BYU's first baseball team was fielded in 1908. The team plays its home games at Larry H. Miller Field in Provo, Utah. The Cougars are coached by Trent Pratt.

Head coaches

Season results

BYU advanced to the 1958 College World Series but withdrew due to a no-Sunday play policy at Brigham Young University.

Notable former players
Danny Ainge
Rick Aguilera
Bert Bradley
Jaycob Brugman
Matt Carson
Taylor Cole
Gary Cooper (outfielder)
Gary Cooper (third baseman)
Ken Crosby
John DeSilva
Jeremy Guthrie
Jacob Hannemann
Doug Howard
Dane Iorg
Wally Joyner
Gary Kroll
Vance Law
Mike Littlewood
Jack Morris
Scott Nielsen
Jerry Nyman
Cliff Pastornicky
Cory Snyder
Kevin Towers

See also
List of NCAA Division I baseball programs

References

External links
 

 
Baseball teams established in 1909
1909 establishments in Utah